is a Japanese anime screenwriter, mystery writer, manga author, travel critic, essayist, professor as well as mystery fiction novels writer. Tsuji was most active in the business from the 1960s through the 1980s, and worked as a script writer on many popular anime television series for Mushi Production, Toei Animation, and Tokyo Movie Shinsha.

He is well known for his association with the animated adaptations of the works of Osamu Tezuka and Go Nagai.

In April 2007, Tsuji headed Japan's first international anime research lab as part of Digital Hollywood University. On December 4, 2007, Tsuji was given a lifetime achievement award at the 11th Japan Media Arts Festival. On September 24, 2008, Tsuji won a Special Award in the 13th Animation Kobe for his writing work.

Filmography

See also
 Honkaku Mystery Writers Club of Japan

References

External links
  
 
 
 

1932 births
Living people
Japanese mystery writers
Mystery Writers of Japan Award winners
Honkaku Mystery Award winners
People from Nagoya
Anime screenwriters